Boslavino is a rural locality (a selo) in Lebedinsky Selsoviet, Tabunsky District, Altai Krai, Russia. The population was 4 as of 2013. There is 1 street.

Geography 
Serebropol is the nearest rural locality.

References 

Rural localities in Tabunsky District